Thomas Bergman (born 9 February 1960) is a former Swedish football player.

During his club career, Bergman played for IF Brommapojkarna, AIK Fotboll, and Vasalunds IF.

Bergman made four appearances for the Sweden national football team, between 1983 and 1984.

External links

1960 births
Swedish footballers
Sweden international footballers
IF Brommapojkarna players
AIK Fotboll players
Vasalunds IF players
Association football defenders
Living people
Footballers from Stockholm